The 90s was a decade that ran from January 1, AD 90, to December 31, AD 99.

As the decade began, the Han–Xiongnu War was approaching its end, with the Xiongnu having been on the verge of collapse since the Battle of the Altai Mountains (89) the prior decade. In 90, Dou Xian dispatched General Geng Kui and Shizi of the Southern Xiongnu with 8000 light cavalry to attack the Northern Chanyu, encamped at Heyun (河雲). There, the Han killed 8000 men and captured several thousands. By 91, the last remnants of the Northern Xiongnu had migrated west towards the Ili River valley, ending the war. After the downfall of the Xiongnu, the Xianbei replaced them with a loose confederacy from 93.

The Roman Empire did not see any significant military action this decade, excepting clashes along the Danube in 92. Economically, the empire saw reforms by Nerva after the death of Domitian in 96, including but not limited to a string of economic reforms intended to alleviate the burden of taxation from the most needy Romans. Before long, Nerva's expenses strained the economy of Rome and, although perhaps not ruinous to the extent once suggested by Syme, necessitated the formation of a special commission of economy to drastically reduce expenditures.

According to some historians, Jews and Christians were heavily persecuted toward the end of Domitian's reign (89-96). The Book of Revelation, which mentions at least one instance of martyrdom (Rev 2:13; cf. 6:9), is thought by many scholars to have been written during Domitian's reign. According to Barnes, "Melito, Tertullian, and Bruttius stated that Domitian persecuted the Christians. Melito and Bruttius vouchsafe no details, Tertullian only that Domitian soon changed his mind and recalled those whom he had exiled". A minority of historians have maintained that there was little or no anti-Christian activity during Domitian's time. The lack of consensus by historians about the extent of persecution during the reign of Domitian derives from the fact that while accounts of persecution exist, these accounts are cursory or their reliability is debated.

In AD 92, the Flavian Palace was completed. Josephus wrote Antiquities of the Jews (covering the history of the Jewish people), Against Apion (a defense of Judaism as a classical religion and philosophy against criticism by Apion), and The Life of Flavius Josephus (an autobiographical text where Josephus details his own life). Tacitus wrote Germania (a historical and ethnographic work on the Germanic peoples outside the Roman Empire) and Agricola (which recounts the life of his father-in-law Gnaeus Julius Agricola, an eminent Roman general and governor of Britain).

Significant people
 Titus Flavius Domitianus, Roman Emperor (AD 81–96)
 Nerva, Roman Emperor (AD 96–98)

References

Works cited

See also